Gohouo-Zagna is a town in western Ivory Coast. It is a sub-prefecture of Bangolo Department in Guémon Region, Montagnes District.

Gohouo-Zagna was a commune until March 2012, when it became one of 1126 communes nationwide that were abolished.

In 2014, the population of the sub-prefecture of Gohouo-Zagna was 17,800.

Villages
The 3 villages of the sub-prefecture of Gohouo-Zagna and their population in 2014 are:
 Glodé (719)
 Gohouo-Zagna (16 836)
 Tié-Iné-Zagna (245)

Notes

Sub-prefectures of Guémon
Former communes of Ivory Coast